The 2016 PDC European Tour was a series of non-televised darts tournaments organised by the Professional Darts Corporation (PDC). Players Championships, UK Open Qualifiers and European Tour events are the events that make up the PDC Pro Tour. This year there are 10 European Tour events being held – 7 in Germany and one each in Austria, Gibraltar and the Netherlands.

Prize money 
Prize money for European Tour events stays the same as in 2015. This is how the prize money is divided:

European Tour events 
Compared to last year, there's one European Tour event added on the calendar. In addition, the top 32 of the European Tour will qualify for the European Championship.

European Tour Qualifiers

UK Qualifiers 

Dutch Darts Masters 
  Mervyn King 
  Simon Whitlock 
  Stephen Bunting 
  Ronnie Baxter 
  Gerwyn Price 
  Jamie Lewis 
  Kevin Thomas 
  John Henderson 
  Daryl Gurney 
  Mark Webster 
  James Richardson 
  Jamie Caven 
  Paul Milford
  Ricky Evans
  David Pallett 
  Ritchie Edhouse 
  Robbie Green 
  Kevin Painter 
  Devon Petersen 
  Ryan Harrington

German Darts Masters 
  Mark Barilli 
  Mark Walsh 
  Stephen Bunting 
  Alan Norris 
  Chris Dobey 
  Ben Davies 
  James Richardson 
  John Bowles 
  Daryl Gurney 
  Nathan Aspinall 
  Steve Beaton 
  Darren Johnson
  Stuart Kellett 
  Andrew Gilding 
  Peter Hudson 
  Joe Cullen
  William O'Connor 
  Kevin Painter 
  Devon Petersen 
  James Wilson 

Gibraltar Darts Trophy 
  Ross Smith
  Nick Fullwell 
  Justin Pipe 
  Stephen Bunting 
  Gerwyn Price
  Daryl Gurney 
  Alan Norris
  Jamie Lewis 
  John Henderson 
  Andy Hamilton 
  Steve Beaton 
  Mark Walsh 
  Steve West 
  Joe Murnan 
  David Pallett 
  Wayne Jones
  Kyle Anderson 
  Kevin Painter 
  Joe Cullen 
  Stuart Kellett 

European Darts Matchplay 
  Phil Taylor (withdrew)
  Richie Corner 
  Darren Webster 
  Josh Payne 
  Jamie Robinson 
  Daryl Gurney 
  Alan Norris 
  Ricky Williams 
  John Henderson 
  Mark Webster 
  Jonny Clayton 
  Jonathan Worsley 
  Jamie Caven
  Joe Murnan 
  Chris Dobey 
  Andrew Gilding 
  Darren Johnson 
  Kevin Painter 
  Joe Cullen 
  Devon Petersen 

Austrian Darts Open 
  Steve West
  Mervyn King
  Justin Pipe
  Brendan Dolan
  Chris Dobey
  Wayne Jones
  Josh Payne
  Steve Beaton
  James Richardson
  Jonny Clayton
  Kyle Anderson
  Jamie Caven
  Nigel Heydon
  Steve McNally
  Darron Brown
  Mark Frost
  Wes Newton
  Simon Stevenson
  James Wilson
  Ross Smith

European Darts Open 
  Alan Norris
  Gerwyn Price
  Daryl Gurney
  Shaun Griffiths
  James Richardson
  Andy Jenkins
  Mark Frost
  Harry Ward
  Jonny Clayton
  Ritchie Edhouse
  Tony Newell
  Steve West
  Kyle Anderson
  Jamie Caven
  Robbie Green
  Andy Boulton
  John Henderson
  Wes Newton
  Andy Hamilton
  Devon Petersen

International Darts Open
  Daryl Gurney
  James Wilson
  Joe Cullen
  Jim Walker
  Andy Hamilton
  Michael Barnard
  James Richardson
  Jamie Caven
  Kyle Anderson
  Brendan Dolan
  Andy Boulton
  Kevin Painter
  Robbie Green
  Ryan Meikle
  Mark Frost
  Ricky Evans
  Devon Petersen
  Chris Dobey
  Darren Webster
  Steve West

European Darts Trophy
  Daryl Gurney
  Mervyn King
  Joe Cullen
  Justin Pipe
  Joe Murnan
  Ritchie Edhouse
  Josh Payne
  Jamie Caven
  Kyle Anderson
  Keegan Brown
  Simon Stevenson
  Andy Jenkins
  Robbie Green
  Jamie Lewis
  Matthew Dennant
  Ricky Evans
  Devon Petersen
  Andy Smith
  Darren Webster
  Steve West

European Darts Grand Prix
  Daryl Gurney
  Arron Monk
  Steve Beaton
  Andy Boulton
  Jonny Clayton
  Scott Dale
  Nathan Aspinall
  James Wilson
  Mick McGowan
  Robbie Green
  Brendan Dolan
  Robert Owen
  James Hubbard
  Jay Foreman
  Mark Frost
  Scott Taylor
  Alan Tabern
  Joe Murnan
  Devon Petersen
  Darren Webster
German Darts Ch'ship
  Mervyn King
  Michael Mansell
  Mark Walsh
  Justin Pipe
  Andy Boulton
  Mark Webster
  Kyle Anderson
  Andy Smith
  Robbie Green
  Brendan Dolan
  Kevin Painter
  Eddie Dootson
  Darren Johnson
  Ted Evetts
  Steve West
  Chris Dobey
  Scott Taylor
  David Pallett
  Peter Hudson
  Steve Hine

European Qualifiers 

Dutch Darts Masters 
  Zoran Lerchbacher 
  Jyhan Artut 
  John Michael 
  Mike De Decker 
  Andree Welge 
  Martin Schindler 
  Dimitri van den Bergh 
  Rowby-John Rodriguez

German Darts Masters 
  Cristo Reyes 
  Thomas Junghans
  Dimitri van den Bergh 
  Mike Zuydwijk 
  John Michael 
  Jeffrey de Graaf
  Ronny Huybrechts
  Jermaine Wattimena 

Gibraltar Darts Trophy 
  Max Hopp 
  Jermaine Wattimena 
  Rowby-John Rodriguez 
  Michael Rasztovits 
  Cristo Reyes 
  Dirk van Duijvenbode 
  Christian Kist 
  Antonio Alcinas 

European Darts Matchplay 
  Michel van der Horst 
  Mike De Decker 
  Vincent van der Voort 
  Ron Meulenkamp 
  Magnus Caris 
  Rowby-John Rodriguez 
  Cristo Reyes 
  Remco van Eijden 

Austrian Darts Open 
  Ron Meulenkamp
  Jermaine Wattimena
  Jeffrey de Graaf
  Vincent van der Voort
  Mike Zuydwijk
  Dimitri van den Bergh
  Christian Kist
  Jeffrey de Zwaan

European Darts Open 
  John Michael
  Cristo Reyes
  Christian Kist
  Jeffrey de Graaf
  Kim Viljanen
  Jan Dekker
  Daniele Petri
  Dimitri van den Bergh

International Darts Open
  Ronny Huybrechts
  Jeffrey de Graaf
  Jeffrey de Zwaan 
  Jermaine Wattimena
  Krzysztof Ratajski 
  Michael Rasztovits
  Vincent Kamphuis 
  Yordi Meeuwisse 

European Darts Trophy
  Dimitri Van den Bergh
  Cristo Reyes
  Janos Végsö
  Zoran Lerchbacher
  Jermaine Wattimena
  Vincent Kamphuis
  Ronny Huybrechts
  Vincent van der Voort

European Darts Grand Prix
  Raymond van Barneveld
  Cristo Reyes 
  Christian Kist 
  Ronny Huybrechts 
  Jermaine Wattimena 
  Jeffrey de Graaf 
  Robert Marijanović 
  Tony West 

German Darts Ch'ship
  Vincent van der Voort
  Cristo Reyes
  Christian Kist
  Rowby-John Rodriguez
  Ron Meulenkamp
  Yordi Meeuwisse
  Tony West
  Janos Végsö

Host Nation Qualifiers 

Dutch Darts Masters 
  Dirk van Duijvenbode 
  Remco van Eijden 
  Jermaine Wattimena 
  Jan Dekker 

German Darts Masters 
  Tomas Seyler
  René Eidams
  Fabian Herz 
  Marko Puls 

Gibraltar Darts Trophy 
  David Francis 
  George Federico 
  Dyson Parody 
  Antony Lopez 

European Darts Matchplay  
  Max Hopp
  Andree Welge 
  René Eidams 
  Jyhan Artut 
 * Maik Langendorf *German residence

Austrian Darts Open  
  Nico Mandl
  Zoran Lerchbacher
  Rowby-John Rodriguez
  Roxy-James Rodriguez

European Darts Open
  Martin Schindler
  Stefan Stoyke
  Holger Rettig
  Fabian Herz
  Max Hopp

International Darts Open
  Maik Langendorf
  René Eidams 
  Max Hopp
  Dragutin Horvat
  Mike Holz

European Darts Trophy
  Max Hopp 
  Jyhan Artut
  Kevin Münch
  Martin Schindler 
  Justin Webers

European Darts Grand Prix
  Max Hopp
  Dragutin Horvat
  Martin Schindler
  Fabian Herz
  Robert Allenstein
  Gabriel Clemens

German Darts Ch'ship
  Stefan Stoyke
  Mike Holz
  Marko Puls
  Robert Allenstein

References 

 
European
2016 in darts